Social Quicksands is a 1918 American silent comedy-drama film, directed by Charles Brabin. It stars Francis X. Bushman, Beverly Bayne, and Mabel Frenyear, and was released on June 10, 1918.

Cast list
 Francis X. Bushman as Warren Dexter
 Beverly Bayne as Phyllis Lane
 Mabel Frenyear as Mollie
 Leslie Stowe as Dudley
 William Dunn as Jim
 Lila Blow as Mrs. Byrd Cutting
 Rolinda Bainbridge as Mrs. Amos
 Elsie MacLeod as Miss "Nobody Home"
 Jack B. Hollis as Englishman
 Armorel McDowell as The "Bullet Girl"
 William Stone
 Jack Dunn

References

External links 
 
 
 

Metro Pictures films
Films directed by Charles Brabin
American silent feature films
American black-and-white films
1918 comedy-drama films
1918 films
1910s English-language films
1910s American films
Silent American comedy-drama films